Quail is a rural small town and census-designated place in Collingsworth County, Texas, United States. The population was 19 at the 2010 census, down from 33 at the 2000 census. The town has a general store, a small hotel and an income tax service.

Geography
Quail is located in west-central Collingsworth County at  (34.918915, -100.386829), along Texas State Highway 203.

Demographics
As of the census of 2000, there were 33 people, 11 households, and 9 families residing in the CDP. The population density was 10.4 people per square mile (4.0/km2). There were 16 housing units at an average density of 5.0/sq mi (1.9/km2). The racial makeup of the CDP was 75.76% White, 3.03% African American and 21.21% Native American.

There were 11 households, out of which 36.4% had children under the age of 18 living with them, 90.9% were married couples living together, and 9.1% were non-families. 9.1% of all households were made up of individuals, and 9.1% had someone living alone who was 65 years of age or older. The average household size was 3.00 and the average family size was 3.10.

In the CDP, the population was spread out, with 24.2% under the age of 18, 12.1% from 18 to 24, 21.2% from 25 to 44, 21.2% from 45 to 64, and 21.2% who were 65 years of age or older. The median age was 38 years. For every 100 females, there were 175.0 males. For every 100 females age 18 and over, there were 150.0 males.

The median income for a household in the CDP was $19,464, and the median income for a family was $19,464. Males had a median income of $30,000 versus $26,250 for females. The per capita income for the CDP was $13,456. None of the population or families were below the poverty line.

Education
Quail is served by the Hedley Independent School District.

References

Census-designated places in Texas
Census-designated places in Collingsworth County, Texas